María José García Jiménez (Villacarrillo, province of Jaén, March 20, 1969) is a Valencian politician, deputy at the Corts Valencianes for the IXth legislature.

Biography 
She is graduated in technical engineering of public works from the Universidad Politécnica de Valencia. She works as a teacher of secondary education in alternative energies. She has also worked as an adviser for the recognition of professional competitions purchased in labour experience.

Politically, she was a member of the Liberal Democratic Centre (CDL), party with which she worked as a councillor of the city council of Alcàsser in 2013. She took part in the I Congress of CDL of February 2014 in which was agreed their integration to the party Citizen – Party of the Citizenship. She was chosen deputy at the elections to the Corts Valencian of 2015.

References

People from the Province of Jaén (Spain)
Living people
Members of the Corts Valencianes
1969 births